Allen Klein (born April 26, 1938) is a pioneer in gelotology and the therapeutic humor movement. In 1974, Klein's wife was only 34 years old when she died of liver disease, and the aspect where she had kept her sense of humor all the way to the end inspired Klein to give up his previous career as a theater and television scene designer and to study human development. Klein is an American author and lecturer on the stress relieving benefits of humor and on gallows humor. Among other positions, Klein was the 2005-2006 president of The Association for Applied and Therapeutic Humor.

Publications 

Klein has written 8 books on the therapeutic benefits of humor, happiness and positivity.

The Healing Power of Humor: Techniques for Getting through Loss, Setbacks, Upsets, Disappointments, Difficulties, Trials, Tribulations, and All That Not-So-Funny Stuff 
The Courage to Laugh: Humor, Hope, and Healing in the Face of Death and Dying 
Learning to Laugh When You Feel Like Crying: Embracing Life After Loss 
L.A.U.G.H.: Using Humor and Play to Help Clients Cope with Stress, Anger, Frustration, and more 
You Can't Ruin My Day: 52 Wake-Up Calls to Turn Any Situation Around 
Secrets Kids Know...That Adults Oughta Learn 
Embracing Life After Loss 
The Awe Factor 

In addition, he has edited several books of inspirational quotations. They are:
Change Your Life!: A Little Book of Big Ideas (foreword by Jack Canfield) 
Inspiration for a Lifetime 
The Art of Living Joyfully (endorsed by SARK) 
Always Look on the Bright Side 
Having the Time of Your Life 
Mom's the Word 
Word of Love 
Positive Thoughts for Troubling Times 
The Joy of Simplicity

Quotes 

Source:
"Humor can help you cope with the unbearable so that you can stay on the bright side of things until the bright side actually comes along."
"Humor does not diminish the pain - it makes the space around it get bigger."
"When we are dealing with death we are constantly being dragged down by the event: Humor diverts our attention and lifts our sagging spirits."
"Your attitude is like a box of crayons that color your world. Constantly color your picture gray, and your picture will always be bleak. *Try adding some bright colors to the picture by including humor, and your picture begins to lighten up."
"The hardest thing you can do is smile when you are ill, in pain, or depressed. But this no-cost remedy is a necessary first half-step if you are to start on the road to recovery."

Awards 
2007 Hunter College, The City University of New York, Hall of Fame honoree
Certified Speaking Professional designation from the National Speakers Association
Toastmasters International Communication and Leadership Award
2009 Doug Fletcher Lifetime Achievement Award from the Association for Applied and Therapeutic Humor

References

External links 

 
 Allen Klein's website
Jeffrey Mishlove interview with Allen Klein

"Laugh Your Way to Health"  New Dimensions Radio interview
"Healing with Humor: Those Who Laugh, Last" Mother Earth News
"Sebastopol Author Allen Klein Shares His Secrets to Happiness"

1938 births
Living people
Humor researchers
American male writers
Writers from New York City